West Denmark is an unincorporated community located in the town of Luck, Polk County, Wisconsin, United States. West Denmark is 1,250 feet [381 m] above sea level.

Notes

Danish-American culture in Wisconsin
Unincorporated communities in Polk County, Wisconsin
Unincorporated communities in Wisconsin